Yalveh-ye Olya (also Romanized as Yalveh-ye ‘Olyā; also known as Fereydūn and Yalvāy-e Fereydūn) is a village in Baladarband Rural District, in the Central District of Kermanshah County, Kermanshah Province, Iran. At the 2006 census, its population was 60, in 15 families.

References 

Populated places in Kermanshah County